The 2022 New Mexico Lobos football team represented the University of New Mexico as a member of the Mountain West Conference during the 2022 NCAA Division I FBS football season. They will be led by head coach Danny Gonzales, who will be coaching his third season with the team. The Lobos will play their home games at University Stadium in Albuquerque, New Mexico.

Schedule
New Mexico and the Mountain West Conference announced the 2022 football schedule on February 16, 2022.

References

New Mexico
New Mexico Lobos football seasons
New Mexico Lobos football